In the Abrahamic religions, the voice of God is a communication from God to human beings, heard by humans as a sound with no apparent physical source.

In rabbinic Judaism, such a voice was known as a bat kol ( baṯ qōl, literally "daughter of voice"), and was a "heavenly or divine voice which proclaims God's will or judgment." It differed from prophecy in that God had a close relationship with the prophet, while the bat kol could be heard by any individual or group regardless of their level of connection to God.

Hebrew Bible  

In the Hebrew Bible, the characteristic attributes of the voice of God are the invisibility of the speaker and a certain remarkable quality in the sound, regardless of its strength or weakness.

A sound proceeding from some invisible source was considered a heavenly voice, since the mass revelation on Sinai was given in that way: "Ye heard the voice of the words, but saw no similitude; only ye heard a voice". In this account, God reveals himself to man through the organs of hearing, not through those of sight. Even the prophet Ezekiel, who saw many visions, "heard a voice of one that spoke"; similarly, Elijah recognized God by a "still, small voice," and a voice addressed him. Sometimes God's voice rang from the heights, from Jerusalem, or from Zion; and God's voice was heard in the thunder and in the roar of the sea.

In later Jewish sources 

The phrase bat kol appears in many Talmudic stories to represent a heavenly or divine voice to human beings. It proclaims God's will or judgment, His deeds and His commandments to individuals or to a number of persons, to rulers, communities, and even to whole nations.

Origin of the name
The phrase bat kol literally means "daughter of voice" – that is, a small voice – in order to distinguish it from the usual voice. The meaning of the word is "sound," "resonance." In this sense it appears in a secular context: "As oil has no bat kol [that is, gives no sound], so Israel is not heard of in this world..." Similarly, in one passage Divine revelation is said to lack a bat kol or echo:

Johanan said, 'When God revealed the Torah, no sparrow chirped, no bird flew, no ox lowed;'... 'These words,' says Simeon ben Lakish, 'are to be taken as follows: If one man calls to another, his voice has a bat kol; but the voice proceeding from God has no bat kol... For if a sound had been heard, the priests would have said: 'Baal has answered us.' On Sinai God caused the whole world to be silent, in order that mankind might know there is none besides Him.

Originally, however, such Divine communication was also in the Hebrew called kol (voice) as is shown by the Biblical phrase "There fell a voice from heaven" ( [A. V. 31]); and occasionally in the Talmud it is briefly given as kol (voice). In the Aramaic versions of the Bible, in the Midrash and Talmud, heavenly revelation is usually introduced with the formula: "A voice fell from heaven," "came from heaven," "was heard," or "proceeded from heaven."

Its nature
The bat kol was considered to be Divine in origin. In the course of the narrative in Berachot 3a, "God" is put instead of "bat kol"; and not infrequently God, when using the bat kol, is represented as speaking in the first person. Sometimes bat kol is identified with the Holy Spirit.

Despite being identified with the Holy Spirit or even with God, the bat kol differed essentially from prophecy. The Holy Spirit rested upon the prophets, and the conversations between them were personal and intimate; while those that heard the bat kol had no relation whatever to the Holy Spirit. The Prophets possessed the Holy Spirit; but the bat kol could not be possessed: God spoke through it as He did through the Prophets. For this reason, the bat kol addressed not only righteous individuals, but sinners, common people, or multitudes, both in the Holy Land and abroad. Prophecy was a gift of which not only the prophet but his generation had to be worthy. From this point of view the bat kol was explained as a lesser gift to Israel than prophecy, but not, as some said, as a lower degree of prophecy.

Content and examples
The bat kol revealed the Divine will in perfectly intelligible words, usually in the form of a passage from the Bible.

According to rabbinical tradition, the bat kol coexisted with prophecy; that is, at a time when the Holy Spirit rested upon Israel, as well as at other times. Thus the bat kol spoke to Abraham, Esau, the Israelites at the Sea of Reeds, Moses and Aaron, Saul, David, Solomon, King Manasseh, Nebuchadnezzar, the inhabitants of Sheol, the Rechabites, Haman, and those feasting with Ahasuerus. The bat kol is frequently connected with Moses' death.

Rabbinic sources state that "after the death of the last three prophets – Haggai, Zechariah, and Malachi – the Holy Spirit departed from Israel; but the bat kol was still heard." Many stories of its later appearance appear in rabbinic literature. A bat kol decided between the Houses of Hillel and Shammai in favor of the House of Hillel. Shimon bar Yochai emerged from his stay in a cave only after receiving permission from a bat kol. In the Oven of Akhnai story, a bat kol declared that the halakha was in accordance with Rabbi Eliezer, yet the other rabbis rejected this declaration on the grounds that the Torah is Not in Heaven. It was said that whenever there is no law, no high-priesthood, and no Sanhedrin, a bat kol cries: "Strengthen ye the weak hands".

It is noteworthy that the rabbinical conception of bat kol sprang up in the period of the decline of Jewish prophecy and flourished in the period of extreme traditionalism. Where the gift of prophecy was believed to be lacking – perhaps even because of this lack – there grew up an inordinate desire for special divine manifestations. Often a voice from heaven was looked for to clear up matters of doubt and even to decide between conflicting interpretations of the law. So strong had this tendency become that Rabbi Joshua (c. 100 CE) felt it to be necessary to oppose it and to insist upon the supremacy and the sufficiency of the written law.

Josephus relates that John Hyrcanus (135–104 BCE) heard a voice while offering a burnt sacrifice in the temple, which Josephus expressly interprets as the voice of God.

In Christianity

It is clear that we have here to do with a conception of the nature and means of divine revelation that is distinctly inferior to the Biblical view. For even in the Biblical passages where mention is made of the voice from heaven, all that is really essential to the revelation is already present, at least in principle, without the audible voice.

Christian scholars interpreted Bath Kol as the Jews' replacement for the great prophets when, "after the death of Malachi, the spirit of prophecy wholly ceased in Israel" (taking the name to refer to its being "the daughter" of the main prophetic "voice").

Other media
The generic term "voice of God" is commonly used in theatrical productions and staging, and refers to any anonymous, disembodied voice used to deliver general messages to the audience. Examples may include speaker introductions, audience directions and performer substitutions.

The origin of the "Voice of God" narration style was most probably in Time Inc's "March of Time" news-radio and news-film series, for which Orson Welles was an occasional voice-over actor, and was subsequently duplicated in Welles' "Citizen Kane" News On The March sequence (the first reel of the film), much to the delight of Henry R. Luce, Time's president.
 Thomas Szasz Psychiatrist wrote "If you talk to God, you are praying; if God talks to you, you have schizophrenia. If the dead talk to you, you are a spiritualist; if God talks to you, you are a schizophrenic." Book title "The Second Sin" (1973)

People called the "Voice of God"
 Bob Sheppard, public-address announcer for New York Yankees baseball games from 1951 to 2007 and for New York Giants football games from 1956 to 2005
 Don LaFontaine, narrator of many film trailers
 John Facenda, Philadelphia newscaster who narrated several NFL Films Productions from 1966 to 1984
 Morgan Freeman, actor, narrator of films and a portrayer of God in Bruce Almighty and Evan Almighty
 Don Pardo, television personality and former announcer on Saturday Night Live

References

Sources
This page draws text from 'The Mirror of Literature, Amusement, and Instruction', Vol. 10, Issue 273, September 15, 1827, a text now in the public domain.
Humphrey Prideaux, The Old and New Testament connected in the history of the Jews, 1851.
Thomas de Quincey, Narrative And Miscellaneous Papers, Vol. II.
Free Prophecy, The Voice of God

Revelation
Jewish mysticism
Jewish theology